The 2008 NAIA Division II Men’s Basketball national championship was held in March at Keeter Gymnasium in Point Lookout, Missouri.  The 17th annual NAIA basketball tournament featured 32 teams playing in a single-elimination format.

Awards and honors

Leading scorer:
Leading rebounder:

Bracket

  * denotes overtime.

See also
2008 NAIA Division I men's basketball tournament
2008 NCAA Division I men's basketball tournament
2008 NCAA Division II men's basketball tournament
2008 NCAA Division III men's basketball tournament
2008 NAIA Division II women's basketball tournament

References

NAIA Men's Basketball Championship
Tournament
2008 in sports in Missouri